Austrian wines are mostly dry white wines (often made from the Grüner Veltliner grape), though some sweeter white wines (such as dessert wines made around the Neusiedler See) are also produced. About 30% of the wines are red, made from Blaufränkisch (also known as Lemberger, or as Kékfrankos in neighbouring Hungary), Pinot noir and locally bred varieties such as Zweigelt. Four thousand years of winemaking history counted for little after the "antifreeze scandal" of 1985, when it was revealed that some wine brokers had been adulterating their wines with diethylene glycol. The scandal destroyed the market for Austrian wine and compelled Austria to tackle low standards of bulk wine production, and reposition itself as a producer of quality wines. The country is also home to Riedel, makers of some of the most expensive wine glasses in the world. Some of the best producers of Austria include Weingut Bründlmayer, Weingut F.X. Pichler and Weingut Franz Hirtzberger, Weingut Hutter, Weingut Eigl and Wellanschitz.

History

There is archaeological evidence of grape growing in Traisental 4000 years ago. Grape seeds have been found in urns dating back to 700 BC in Zagersdorf, whilst bronze wine flagons of the Celtic La Tène culture dating to the 5th century BC have been found at Dürrnberg in Salzburg state. Viticulture thrived under the Romans, once Marcus Aurelius Probus (Roman emperor 276–282) had overturned the ban on growing grapes north of the Alps. Both Grüner Veltliner and Welschriesling appear to have been grown around the Danube since Roman times.

Viticulture suffered with the invasions of Bavarians, Slavs and Avars after the fall of the Roman Empire, but from 788 the rule of Charlemagne saw considerable reconstruction of vineyards and introduction of new grape presses. Once Otto the Great had seen off the threat from Magyar incursions in 955, Austrian viticulture was nurtured by the Church and encouraged among the populace at large. The first vineyard names recorded are Kremser Sandgrube in 1208, and Steiner Pfaffenberg in 1230. Rudolf IV introduced the first wine tax, Ungeld, in 1359, as Vienna established itself as a centre for wine trading on the Danube.

The wine business boomed in the 16th century, but the Thirty Years War and others of the 17th century took their toll, as much due to the heavy taxation of the period as the direct disruption of war. Various drink taxes were unified in 1780, as part of a drive by Maria Theresa and Joseph II to encourage viticulture. An imperial decree of 17 August 1784 gave birth to the distinctive Austrian tradition of inns called Heurigen.  Derived from the German for "new wine", the decree allowed all winemakers to sell home-grown food with their wine all year round. Fir trees hung above the door alerted customers to the arrival of the new season's wine.

The 19th century saw the arrival of all sorts of biological invaders.  First there was powdery mildew (Uncinula necator) and downy mildew (Peronospora). One response to these fungal diseases from North America was the founding in 1860 of what became the Federal Institute for Viticulture and Pomology at Klosterneuburg. Then the phylloxera root aphid arrived in 1872 and wiped out most of the vineyards of central Europe.  Although it took several decades for the industry to recover, it allowed lower quality grapes to be replaced with better varieties, particularly Grüner Veltliner. After World War I, Austria was the third biggest wine producer in the world, much being exported in bulk for blending with wine from Germany and other countries.

However that intensification of viticulture sowed the seeds of its own destruction.  During the twentieth century Austrian wine became a high-volume, industrialised business, with much of it being sold in bulk to Germany. A run of favourable years in the early 1980s saw massive yields of wines that were light, dilute and acidic, that nobody wanted. Wine brokers discovered that these wines could be made saleable by the addition of a little diethylene glycol, more commonly found in antifreeze, which imparted sweetness and body to the wine. The adulteration was difficult to detect chemically—the 'antifreeze scandal' broke when one of them tried to claim for the cost of the chemical on his tax return. Although the amounts of glycol were less dangerous than the alcohol in the wine, and only a few middlemen were involved, exports collapsed and some countries banned Austrian wine altogether.  The antifreeze jokes persist, but in fact the scandal was the saviour of the industry in Austria.  Strict new regulations restricted yields among other things, producers moved towards more red wine and a dry style of white wine that was what the 1990s market would demand, and the middlemen went bust forcing producers to sell direct and encouraging the expression of local terroir. Perhaps most importantly, there was a massive change in the culture of wine production in Austria towards an emphasis on quality, as opposed to the low standards that permitted the scandal to happen in the first place.

The Austrian Wine Marketing Board was created in 1986 as a response to the scandal, and Austria's membership of the European Union has prompted further revisions of her wine laws, notably the new DAC system of geographical appellations launched in 2002 (see Classification section below). Today Austria lies 16th in the list of wine producing countries by volume (2011).

Grape varieties

As can be seen from the table, Grüner Veltliner is the dominant white grape in Austria, producing generally dry wines ranging from short-lived Heuriger wines to Spätleses capable of long life. The ancient Welschriesling variety is used in the noble rot dessert wines of the Neusiedlersee; it also makes undistinguished dry wines for drinking young, as does Müller-Thurgau (Rivaner). Neuburger was supposedly found as flotsam in the Danube in the 1850s, but is now known to be a cross between Silvaner and the ancient Roter Veltliner. Frühroter Veltliner is also known as Malvasier, suggesting a link to the Malvasia grape family of the Eastern Mediterranean. Muscat Ottonel is used in dessert wines from the Neusiedlersee, as is Bouvier, which is related to the muscat family and is a parent of the Orémus (Zéta) grape used in Tokaji. There were high hopes for Goldburger, a cross between Welschriesling and Orangetraube bred in Klosterneuburg, but after an initial wave of planting, enthusiasm has dimmed. Zierfandler (Spätrot) and Rotgipfler are local grapes of the Thermenregion, and are often blended together as Spätrot-Rotgipfler. It is worth noting that Pinot gris is known as Ruländer in Austria, and sometimes as Grauburgunder; Pinot blanc is known as Weißburgunder or Weissburgunder, and Sauvignon blanc is called Muskat Sylvaner. Riesling plays a much smaller role than in Germany, but the relatively small amount grown is used for some of Austria's most appreciated dry white wines.

Zweigelt (sometimes called Zweigeltblau, a Blaufränkisch × St. Laurent cross) and Blauburger (Blaufränkisch × BlauerPortugieser) were bred at Klosterneuburg in the 1920s and now account for nearly half of Austria's red wine. The former can be made into powerful wines for ageing, the latter is easier to grow and is generally blended; both are also made into a lighter style for drinking young.

Blaufränkisch and Blauer Portugieser are the traditional red grapes of the region, being part of the blend of Hungary's Egri Bikavér. The former is the more "serious" variety, Blauer Portugieser produces fresh, fruity red wines for drinking young. Saint Laurent came from France in the mid-19th century, and seems to have substantial Pinot noir (Blauerburgunder) parentage; St Laurent has a reputation for being problematic to grow, but can produce good quality wine. Blauer Wildbacher is probably an indigenous wild grape variety, used to make a cult rosé called Schilcher in western Styria. Rössler is the latest variety to be bred at Klosterneuburg.

Classification
Since joining the EU the Austrians have made real efforts to improve matters. At present there are three systems—the traditional system based on the German scheme, a different classification used only in the Wachau, and a new system of regional appellations called DACs that is being trialled in the Weinviertel.

National Classification

The existing system was based on the German system during World War II, but was modified after 1985. It is based on the Klosterneuberger Mostwaage (KMW), which measures the sugar content of the grapes at harvest in a way similar to the Öchsle scale, where 1°KMW is ~5°Oe.
 Tafelwein: >10.7°KMW, can come from more than one region
 Landwein: >14°KMW, >17 g/litre dry extract, <11.5% alcohol, <6 g/L residual sugar. A Tafelwein that comes from just one region.
 Qualitätswein: >15°KMW (can be chaptalised to 19°KMW for whites, 20°KMW for reds), >9% alcohol. Comes from a single wine district.
 Kabinett: >17°KMW Qualitätswein with no chaptalisation, residual sugar <9 g/litre, alcohol <12.7%.
 Prädikatswein : covers the range from Spätlese to Eiswein, to which nothing can be added—no must, no chaptalisation. Most of the wines may not be released until 1 May after harvest.
 Spätlese: >19°KMW, wine not released until 1 March after harvest
 Auslese: >21°KMW, bad grapes removed
 Beerenauslese: >25°KMW, bad grapes removed
 Ausbruch: >27°KMW, botrytised grapes, grape juice or late harvest wine may be added to assist the pressing operation.
 Trockenbeerenauslese: >30°KMW, completely botrytised grapes
 Eiswein: >25°KMW, further concentrated by being harvested and pressed when frozen.
 Strohwein or Schilfwein: >25°KMW, made from grapes dried on straw mats.

Wachau Classification
The "Vinea Wachau Nobilis Districtus" has three categories, all for dry wines:
 Steinfeder ("Stone feather"—named after a grass, Stipa pennata, that grows in the vineyards): maximum 11.5% alcohol, mostly for local quaffing.
 Federspiel (named after a falconry device): 11.5% to 12.5% alcohol and a minimum must weight of 17° KMW, roughly equivalent to Kabinett.
 Smaragd (named after an 'emerald' lizard that lives in the vineyards): minimum 12.5% alcohol, with a maximum 9 g/litre residual sugar; some of the best dry whites in Austria.

Districtus Austriae Controllatus (DAC)

Districtus Austriae Controllatus, Latin for "Controlled District of Austria", is the new geographical appellation, similar to the French AOC or the Italian DOCG. Regional wine committees award the DAC to wines typical of their region. There are now ten DACs:

 Weinviertel DAC (for Grüner Veltliner)
 Mittelburgenland DAC (for Blaufränkisch)
 Traisental DAC (for both Riesling and Grüner Veltliner)
 Kremstal DAC (for both Riesling and Grüner Veltliner)
 Kamptal DAC (for both Riesling and Grüner Veltliner)
 Leithaberg DAC (for Grüner Veltliner, Weißburgunder, Chardonnay, Neuburger and Blaufränkisch, beginning September 2010)
 Eisenberg DAC (for Blaufränkisch, beginning September 2010)
 Neusiedlersee DAC (100% Zweigelt for Klassik and min 60% Zweigelt for Reserve Cuvée Blend)
 Wiener Gemischter Satz DAC (minimum of three white grape varieties of one vineyard, harvested and produced together)
 Schilcherland DAC (for Blauer Wildbacher)

Wine regions

In 2005 Austria had 51,213 hectares of vineyard, almost all of it in the east of the country. Of these 31,425 ha are in the state of Niederösterreich (Lower Austria) and 15,386 ha in Burgenland which together make up Weinland Österreich.  Steiermark (Styria) accounts for 3,749 ha, Wien (Vienna) 621 ha and there are 32 ha in "the Austrian Mountains" (Bergland Österreich), which covers the rest of the country. The four main wine regions are split into 16 districts.

Lower Austria

Wachau 

This narrow valley of the Danube around Melk is reminiscent of the great wine areas of the Rhine, with steep terraces that produce world-class Grüner Veltliner and Riesling wines. Climatically and geologically it marks the transition from the Alps to the Hungarian plains, leading to a diverse array of microclimates and terroir, with the river moderating the effects of the cold Alpine winds. As mentioned above, the Vinea Wachau Nobilis Districtus still clings to its own classification of Steinfeder, Federspiel and Smaragd, reserved for wines that are made 100% from Wachau grapes.

Kremstal 

Downstream of the Wachau lies the Kremstal region, centred on the town of Krems. The valley opens out a little, the climate is a little warmer allowing more red wine to be produced, but otherwise Kremstal is quite similar to the Wachau.

Kamptal

To the north of Krems lies Langenlois, which is the main town of Kamptal, the valley of the river Kamp. The sandstone slopes are so steep that only a thin layer of soil is retained, and exposure to the sun is high. Riesling thrives on these steep slopes; closer to the Danube the valley broadens and more red grapes are grown.

Traisental

To the south of Krems lies Herzogenburg, at the centre of Traisental, which was only designated as a wine district in 1995. Mostly Grüner Veltliner is grown here, which is made into a fresh style for drinking young.

Wagram
Between Krems and Vienna lies the Wagram, which covers two very different areas.  North of the Danube is the plateau of Wagram, where the Grüner Veltliner is a bit more full-bodied and aromatic, and Roter Veltliner is something of a local speciality.  Blauer Zweigelt and Pinot noir wines are also made here, as well as a little Eiswein.

Further downstream, just outside Vienna lies Klosterneuburg. As the biggest private wine estate in the country, the abbey has played a formative role in Austrian wine for the last 900 years. The Federal Institute for Viticulture and Pomology was the world's first college of viticulture and continues to play an important part in the development of wine in Austria.

Weinviertel

The Weinviertel lies in the northeast corner of Austria, between the Danube and the Czech and Slovak borders. The biggest single wine region in Austria is home to half the Grüner Veltliner in the country (subject of the first DAC), and considerable amounts of Welschriesling, but most of Austria's varieties can be found here. Even sparkling wine is made from Riesling and Grüner Veltliner in the far northeast around Poysdorf.

Carnuntum

The deep soils between Vienna and the Neusiedlersee are rapidly establishing a reputation for well-balanced red wines made from Zweigelt and Blaufränkisch. Being close to Vienna and full of history, the area is a popular area to visit.

Thermenregion

The spa region south of Vienna saw two wine regions, Gumpoldskirchen and Bad Vöslau, merged in 1985. Climatically similar to Burgundy, with a wide variation in soils, all kinds of grape varieties are made here, many being made into heurigen wines.  Perhaps the most interesting wines are the Spätrot-Rotgipflers, made from a blend of the local varieties Zierfandler (Spätrot) and Rotgipfler, both of which are white grapes despite their names.

Burgenland

Neusiedlersee

The east side of the Neusiedler See is also known as Seewinkel, "corner of the lake". The shallow Neusiedler See (Lake Neusiedl) is one of the few places on earth where noble rot attacks grapes reliably every year. This means that botrytised dessert wines can be made more easily, and hence sold more cheaply, than in other areas famous for this style of wine. Increasingly, red wine is also being made in this region.

Leithaberg

The "hill country" to the west of the lake offers a diversity of terrain that is reflected in the number of grape varieties and styles of wine made here.  Perhaps the most famous is the Ruster Ausbruch dessert wine from the western shore of the lake.

Mittelburgenland

The Mittelburgenland is a southern continuation of the forested hills to the west of the Neusiedlersee. The nickname "Blaufränkischland" reflects the dominant variety here, which is the subject of the only red wine DAC and can be very good, the Bordeaux varieties also do well here.

Eisenberg

The most famous vineyard of the South Burgenland, Eisenberg reflects the red, iron-rich soil which imparts a distinct spiciness to the Blaufränkisch grown here. A speciality here is Uhudler wine, made from hybrids with North American species such as Isabella, Concord, Delaware, Noah, Elvira and Ripadella, which was banned for a while after the 1985 scandal.

Vienna

There are 621 ha of vineyards within the city limits of the Austrian capital. Vines were grown within the city walls of Vienna in the Middle Ages, although they have now been pushed into the outskirts. Riesling, Chardonnay and Pinot blanc are grown on the limestone soils towards Klosterneuburg, whereas red grapes do better on the rich soil to the south of the city. Field blends known as Gemischter Satz are common here, and most wine is drunk young in the city's heurigen.

Styria

Under a 2002 amendment to the wine laws, Steirerland (the modern Austrian state) replaced Steiermark (the old duchy, which included the eastern half of modern Slovenia) as the name for Styria on wine.

Vulkanland Steiermark

The many extinct volcanoes east of Graz give a rich soil which imparts a spiciness to the variety of grapes grown in Southeast Styria. The climate is a little cooler here, especially at night, giving a long growing season resulting in wines that are crisp, aromatic and full bodied.

Thirteen hundred hectares of vineyards are cultivated—all located around Klöch, Sankt Anna am Aigen and Straden and situated primarily on the slopes of the extinct volcanoes which characterize the landscape. Some vineyards are up to 650 m above sea level.

The main grape varieties grown in this region are Welschriesling, Chardonnay (called Morillon), Weißburgunder (Pinot blanc) and Grauburgunder (Pinot gris), Gelber Muskateller, the Traminer family, Sauvignon blanc and Riesling; red wines feature Zweigelt as well as other grapes, including St. Laurent or Blauburgunder (Pinot noir).

Viticulture is generally a part-time job for wine-growers; their produce is sold mainly in the numerous Heurigen.

Südsteiermark

Südsteiermark (South Styria), near the Slovenian border, is mainly Sauvignon blanc country—however, the 1,950 hectares of vineyards also include Welschriesling, Morillon, Muskateller and Traminer.

Soil types include sandstone, shale, clay and shelly limestone. The combination of warm days and cool nights gives a long growing season, resulting in crisp, aromatic and full-bodied wines.

The warm humid climate and steep hills make this one of the toughest places in Austria to be a vigneron.

Weststeiermark

Southwest of Graz lie ancient vineyards which mainly produce a cult rosé called Schilcher. Made from the indigenous Blauer Wildbacher grape, genuine Schilcher carries a mark with a white horse, after the Lipizzaners bred in Piber for the Spanish Riding School in Vienna.

See also

 1985 diethylene glycol wine scandal
 Czech wine
 German wine
 Hungarian wine
 Old World wine
 Slovenian wine

References

External links
 Statistics about Austrian wine
 Classifications of Austrian wine
 Austrian Wine Marketing
 Austrian Vineyards, map of Austrian wine origins
 Wine Anorak website—Austrian section
 https://web.archive.org/web/20161110000859/http://www.austrianwineandspirits.co.uk/ purchase Austrian wine